Jamsil-dong is a neighbourhood, dong, of Songpa-gu, Seoul, South Korea. Its name is derived from silkworm breeding during the Joseon dynasty. Jamsil translates to a room or place for sericulture ("jam" is silkworm, "sil" is room). The state encouraged people to raise silkworms, so founded Dongjamsil (동잠실, literally "east place for sericulture") in the east vicinity of Seoul.

Attractions
 Lotte World
 Jamsil Baseball Stadium
 Jamsil Hangang Park
 Sincheon

Education
Schools located in Jamsil-dong:
 Seoul Beodeul Elementary School
 Seoul Jamil Elementary School
 Seoul Jamjeon Elementary School
 Seoul Jamsin Elementary School
 Seoul Sincheon Elementary School
 Seoul Songjeon Elementary School
 Aju Middle School
 Chungshin Girls' Middle School
 Jamsin Middle School
 Sincheon Middle School
 Chungshin Girls' High School
 Jamil High School
 Jamsin High School
 Youngdongil High School

Transportation
 Jamsilsaenae Station (formally Sincheon Station) of 
 Sports Complex station of

See also
Administrative divisions of South Korea

References

External links
 Jamsil bon-dong resident center site
 Songpa-gu map

Neighbourhoods of Songpa District